The 1929 Southern League was the inaugural season of speedway in the United Kingdom for Southern British teams. There was also a Northern League called the 1929 Speedway English Dirt Track League that started during the same year.

Summary
Stamford Bridge were crowned as the first champions, just two points ahead of Southampton Saints. Hall Green withdrew after 7 meetings and their record was expunged.

Final table

Withdrawal (Record expunged) : Hall Green

Top Five Riders

See also
List of United Kingdom Speedway League Champions

References

Speedway Southern League
1929 in British motorsport
1929 in speedway